Katherine Sonderegger is William Meade Chair in Systematic Theology at Virginia Theological Seminary.

Biography 
Sonderegger received her AB in Medieval Studies from Smith College (1972), an M.Div. (Biblical Studies, 1976) and STM (Theology, 1984) at Yale Divinity School, and a Ph.D. from Brown University in Western Religious Thought (1990). Her Ph.D. dissertation was revised and published as That Jesus Christ was Born a Jew: Karl Barth's Doctrine of Israel (1992). She has taught at Middlebury Seminary (1987–2002) and Bangor Theological Seminary (1993–1996) and, since 2002, at Virginia Theological Seminary, where she became the William Meade Professor in 2014. She was ordained a minister of the United Church of Christ in 1977, but in 1993 confirmed into the Episcopal Church and ordained a deacon and a priest in 2000.

In 2022, she was awarded the Karl Barth Prize by the Union of Evangelical Churches in the Evangelische Kirche in Deutschland for her work in Barth studies and in praise of her more recent work in constructive theology.

Systematic Theology 
In 2015, Sonderegger published her second book, The Doctrine of God, the first in a planned multi-volume systematic theology. Her project will focus on the unity of God in contrast to what she sees as the overemphasis of contemporary Christian theology on the Trinity. It also emphasizes that systematic theology should be undergirded by the Christian Bible. In 2020, she published her second book, The Doctrine of the Holy Trinity: Processions and Persons. She is currently at work on the third volume, Divine Missions, Christology, and Pneumatology.

Writings 

 Systematic Theology, Volume 2: The Doctrine of the Holy Trinity: Processions and Persons. Minneapolis: Fortress Press, 2020. 
 Praying the Stations of the Cross: Finding Hope in a Weary Land, with Margaret Adams Parker. Grand Rapids: William Eerdmans Publishing, 2019.
 The God We Worship: Conversations with Katherine Sonderegger. Barton: St. Mark's National Theological Centre, 2019.
 Systematic Theology, Volume 1: The Doctrine of God. Minneapolis: Fortress Press, 2015. 
 That Jesus Christ Was Born a Jew: Karl Barth's Doctrine of Israel. Pennsylvania: Pennsylvania State University Press, 1992.

References

21st-century American Episcopalians
21st-century Anglican priests
21st-century Anglican theologians
American Episcopal priests
American Episcopal theologians
Brown University alumni
Converts to Anglicanism from Congregationalism
Women Anglican clergy
Living people
Middlebury College faculty
Smith College alumni
Systematic theologians
Women Christian theologians
Yale Divinity School alumni
21st-century American clergy
1950 births